The Buil Film Awards is a South Korean film awards ceremony hosted by the Busan Ilbo newspaper. It began in 1958 as one of the earliest film awards in the country. During the 1950s and 1960s, it was the biggest film awards event in the Busan region, and was held annually until 1973. The event went into a 34-year hiatus from 1974 to 2007 when the film industry lost its appeal due to government censorship and the burgeoning television industry.

Award ceremonies
After an absence of 23 years, the awards were revived when the 17th Buil Film Awards took place on October 9, 2008 at the Grand Hotel in Haeundae District, Busan. It is currently one of the highlights of the ongoing Busan International Film Festival.

The 30th Buil Film Awards was held on October 7, 2021 at the Busan Exhibition and Convention Center (BEXCO Auditorium) in Busan. The highlight of this year's awards was inclusion of Over-the-top (OTT) films such as The Call and Night in Paradise for the first time.

Categories

Best Film
Best Director
Best Leading Actor
Best Leading Actress
Best Supporting Actor
Best Supporting Actress
Best New Director
Best New Actor
Best New Actress
Best Screenplay
Best Cinematography
Best Art Direction
Best Music
Buil Readers' Jury Award (via internet voting)
Yu Hyun-mok Film Arts Award
Best Foreign Film

Best Film

Best Director

Best Actor

Best Actress

Best Supporting Actor

Best Supporting Actress

Best New Director

Best New Actor

Best New Actress

Best Screenplay

Best Cinematography

Best Art Direction

Best Music

Buil Readers' Jury Award

Yu Hyun-mok Film Arts Award

Other Awards

Best Foreign Film

Note: the whole list above is referenced.

References

External links 
 

 
South Korean film awards
Awards established in 1958
Busan
1958 establishments in South Korea
Annual events in South Korea